The 1997–98 Tunisian Ligue Professionnelle 1 season was the 72nd season of top-tier football in Tunisia.

Results

League table

Result table

Leaders

References
1997–98 Ligue 1 on RSSSF.com

Tunisian Ligue Professionnelle 1 seasons
Tun